Rasim Ramaldanov (born 24 January 1986) is an Azerbaijani former professional footballer who played as a defender and is now a coach for Gabala

Club career
Rasim Ramaldanov signed his first professional contract in 2008 at the age of 22 with Simurq PFC. He renewed the contract and became the capitan of this team in 2010.
Ramaldanov signed a new two-year contract with Khazar Lankaran in June 2015. In November 2015 Ramaldanov terminated his contract with Khazar Lankaran due to unpaid wages.
On 26 January 2016, Ramaldanov signed with Sumgayit.
In July 2016 Ramaldanov joined Kolkheti-1913 Poti

On 30 January 2017, Ramaldanov signed for Gabala until the end of the 2016–17 season.

In July 2021, Ramaldanov was appointed as a coach of Gabala.

Career statistics

Club

National team

As of match played 13 October 2014.

Honours
Khazar Lankaran
 Azerbaijan Supercup: 2013

Gabala
 Azerbaijan Cup: 2018–19

References

External links
Profile at clubs official home page

1986 births
Living people
Azerbaijani footballers
Azerbaijan international footballers
Azerbaijani expatriate footballers
Simurq PIK players
Khazar Lankaran FK players
FC Kolkheti-1913 Poti players
Azerbaijan Premier League players
Association football defenders
Expatriate footballers in Georgia (country)
Footballers from Baku